Rich à la Rakha is a 1968 studio album by Buddy Rich and Alla Rakha.

Track listing
LP side A
"Khanda Kafi" (Ravi Shankar) – 5:18
"Duet in Dadra" (Alla Rakha, Buddy Rich) – 4:19
"Rangeelā" (Shankar) – 7:40
LP side B
"Nagma E Raksh" (Rakha) – 4:44
"Tal Sawari" (Rakha, Rich) – 14:30

Personnel
Buddy Rich – drums, dholak, dholki
Alla Rakha – tabla
Ravi Shankar – conductor
Paul Horn – flute
Nodu C. Mullick – tamboura, manjeera
Production
Woody Woodward – art direction
Lanky Linstrot – engineer, audio engineer
Ken Hunt – liner notes
Collin Walcott
Richard Bock – producer, audio production
Gabor Halmos – design

References

World Pacific WPS-21453

1968 albums
Buddy Rich albums
World Pacific Records albums
Albums conducted by Ravi Shankar
Albums produced by Richard Bock (producer)